The Three Peaks Challenge is a mountain running trail that involves ascending the three major peaks above Cape Town, namely Devil's Peak, Table Mountain and Lion's Head.

History 
The route was first completed by Carl Wilhelm Schneeberger in 1897. Schneeberger completed the course in 9 hours and 5 minutes, not counting his rest stops at the old Johannesburg Hotel in Long Street after each peak. On the centenary of Schneeberger's feat, Don Hartley and a group of 13 runners took on the challenge on 13 September 1997, and the time has been continually bettered since.

Records 
Bold = current record; an asterisk indicates solo efforts.

References

Mountain running competitions
Athletics competitions in South Africa